Pițigaia may refer to several villages in Romania:

 Pițigaia, a village in Stâlpeni Commune, Argeș County
 Pițigaia, a village in Frumușani Commune, Călărași County

See also 
 Pițigoi, a village in Prahova Commune, Romania